Robert Joseph Taylor (born 1 November 1873) was an English first-class cricketer, who played in three matches, two for Lancashire in June 1898 and one for Worcestershire in August 1900. He also played for Lancashire Second XI between 1897 and 1899.

Taylor took two first-class wickets, both for Lancashire: his victims were Frederick Holland and Gregor MacGregor.

External links
 

1873 births
Year of death missing
English cricketers
Lancashire cricketers
Worcestershire cricketers
Cricketers from Liverpool
Suffolk cricketers